Aliabad-e Kamfiruz may refer to:
 Aliabad-e Kamfiruz-e Olya
 Aliabad-e Kamfiruz-e Sofla